The Missouri State Bears baseball team represents Missouri State University, which is located in Springfield, Missouri. The Bears are an NCAA Division I college baseball program that competes in the Missouri Valley Conference. They began competing in Division I in 1983 and joined the Missouri Valley Conference in 1991 after seven seasons with the Mid-Continent Conference.

The Missouri State Bears play all home games on campus at John Q. Hammons Field. Under the direction of head coach Keith Guttin, the Bears have played in 11 NCAA Tournaments, and they reached the College World Series in 2003. Over their 29 seasons in the Missouri Valley Conference, they have won six MVC regular-season titles and four MVC tournaments.

Since the program's inception in 1964, 20 Bears have gone on to play in Major League Baseball, highlighted by three-time All-Star and 2006 NL MVP Ryan Howard.

References

External links